The 2017 season was Remo's 103rd existence. The club participated in the Campeonato Brasileiro Série C, the Campeonato Paraense, the Copa Verde and the Copa do Brasil.

Remo finished outside of the top four of the Campeonato Brasileiro Série C (7th place in the group stage and 14th overall). The club finished in the 2nd place of the Campeonato Paraense. In the Copa Verde, Remo was eliminated in the quarter-finals by Santos-AP 4-2 in the aggregate. In the Copa do Brasil, the club was eliminated in the first round by Brusque.

Players

Squad information
Numbers in parentheses denote appearances as substitute.

Top scorers

Disciplinary record

Kit
Supplier: Topper / Main sponsor: Banpará

Transfers

Transfers in

Transfers out

Competitions

Campeonato Brasileiro Série C

Group stage

Matches

Campeonato Paraense

Group stage

Matches

Final stage

Semi-finals

Finals

Copa Verde

Round of 16

Quarter-finals

Copa do Brasil

First round

References

External links
Official Site 
Remo 100% 

2017 season
Clube do Remo seasons
Brazilian football clubs 2017 season